Westsound is an Independent Local Radio station based in Glasgow, Scotland, owned and operated by Bauer as part of the Greatest Hits Radio Network. It broadcasts to Dumfries and Galloway.

Overview
Westsound in Dumfries and Galloway is one of three FM stations forming part of the Greatest Hits Radio network and carries networked programming, with local news and travel.

In September 2019, all local programming from Dumfries ended and local breakfast and drive is coming from Glasgow.

The station is due to be rebranded to Greatest Hits Radio Dumfries and Galloway on 3 April 2023.

History 
Westsound began broadcasting in May 1990, from studios at Campbell House in the grounds of the Crichton Estate, under the name South West Sound FM.

The station later moved to studios in the town's shopping centre, The Loreburne Centre, where it remained until its local shows were axed in 2019.

Programming and presenters
All of Westsound's programming is carried from Greatest Hits Radio's network of locally branded Scottish stations with some off-peak output also carried from GHR's sister network in England.

Networked programming originates from the studios of Clyde 2 in Clydebank, Forth 2 in Edinburgh, Tay 2 in Dundee and from Greatest Hits Radio's Birmingham, Nottingham, London and Manchester studios.

Occasional programming is produced and broadcast from MFR 2 in Inverness and Northsound 2 in Aberdeen.

News
Westsound broadcasts local news bulletins hourly from 6am to 7pm on weekdays and from 7am to 1pm at weekends. Headlines are broadcast on the half-hour during weekday breakfast and drivetime shows, alongside sport and traffic bulletins.

National bulletins from Sky News Radio are carried overnight with bespoke networked Scottish bulletins on weekend afternoons, produced from Radio Clyde's newsroom in Clydebank.

References

External links
 

Bauer Radio
Greatest Hits Radio
Radio stations in Scotland
Dumfries and Galloway
Radio stations established in 1990